Thomas Beaumont (died c. 1582), of Norwich, Norfolk, was an English politician.

He was a Member of Parliament (MP) for Norwich in 1572.

References

Year of birth missing
1582 deaths
Politicians from Norwich
English MPs 1572–1583